The state of Kerala, India, has 567 bird species within its boundaries. 

This list's taxonomic treatment (designation and sequence of orders, families and species) and nomenclature (common and scientific names) follow the conventions of the IOC World Bird List, version 11.2. This list also uses British English throughout.  Any bird names or other wording follows that convention. The species list and English names are entirely based on the Checklist of Birds of Kerala published in November 2015.

The following tags have been used to highlight several categories. The commonly occurring native species do not fit within any of these categories.

(A) Accidental - Also known as a rarity, it refers to a species that rarely or accidentally occurs in Kerala-typically less than ten confirmed records.

Ducks, geese, and swans

Order: AnseriformesFamily: Anatidae

Anatidae includes the ducks and most duck-like waterfowl, such as geese and swans. These birds are adapted to an aquatic existence with webbed feet, flattened bills, and feathers that are excellent at shedding water due to an oily coating.

Fulvous whistling duck, Dendrocygna bicolor (A)
Lesser whistling duck, Dendrocygna javanica
Bar-headed goose, Anser indicus
Knob-billed duck, Sarkidiornis melanotos
Ruddy shelduck, Tadorna ferruginea
Cotton pygmy goose, Nettapus coromandelianus 
Garganey, Spatula querquedula
Northern shoveler, Spatula clypeata
Gadwall, Mareca strepera
Eurasian wigeon, Mareca penelope
Indian spot-billed duck, Anas poecilorhyncha
Northern pintail, Anas acuta
Eurasian teal, Anas crecca
Common pochard, Aythya ferina (A)
Ferruginous duck, Aythya nyroca 
Tufted duck, Aythya fuligula (A)

Pheasants and allies
Order: GalliformesFamily: Phasianidae

The Phasianidae are a family of terrestrial birds. In general, they are plump (although they vary in size) and have broad, relatively short wings.

Grey francolin, Francolinus pondicerianus
Rain quail, Coturnix coromandelica
Jungle bush quail, Perdicula asiatica 
Painted bush quail, Perdicula erythrorhyncha
Red spurfowl, Galloperdix spadicea
Painted spurfowl, Galloperdix lunulata
Grey junglefowl, Gallus sonneratii
Indian peafowl, Pavo cristatus

Frogmouths

Order: CaprimulgiformesFamily: Podargidae

The frogmouths are a group of nocturnal birds related to the nightjars. They are named for their large flattened hooked bill and huge frog-like gape, which they use to take insects.

Sri Lanka frogmouth, Batrachostomus moniliger

Nightjars
Order: CaprimulgiformesFamily: Caprimulgidae

Nightjars are medium-sized nocturnal birds that usually nest on the ground. They have long wings, short legs and very short bills. Most have small feet, of little use for walking, and long pointed wings. Their soft plumage is camouflaged to resemble bark or leaves.

Great eared nightjar, Lyncornis macrotis
Jungle nightjar, Caprimulgus indicus
Jerdon's nightjar, Caprimulgus atripennis
Indian nightjar, Caprimulgus asiaticus
Savanna nightjar, Caprimulgus affinis

Treeswifts
Order: ApodiformesFamily: Hemiprocnidae

The treeswifts, or crested swifts, are closely related to the true swifts. They differ from the other swifts in that they have crests, long forked tails and softer plumage. 

Crested treeswift, Hemiprocne coronata

Swifts
Order: ApodiformesFamily: Apodidae

Swifts are small birds which spend the majority of their lives flying. These birds have very short legs and never settle voluntarily on the ground, perching instead only on vertical surfaces. Many swifts have long swept-back wings which resemble a crescent or boomerang.

Indian swiftlet, Aerodramus unicolor
Edible-nest swiftlet, Aerodramus fuciphagus
White-rumped spinetail, Zoonavena sylvatica
Brown-backed needletail, Hirundapus giganteus
Asian palm swift, Cypsiurus balasiensis
Alpine swift, Tachymarptis melba
Common swift, Apus apus 
Blyth's swift, Apus leuconyx 
Little swift, Apus affinis

Bustards
Order: OtidiformesFamily: Otididae

Bustards are large terrestrial birds mainly associated with dry open country and steppes in the Old World. They are omnivorous and nest on the ground. They walk steadily on strong legs and big toes, pecking for food as they go. They have long broad wings with "fingered" wingtips and striking patterns in flight. Many have interesting mating displays.

Macqueen's bustard, Chlamydotis undulata 
Lesser florican, Sypheotides indicus

Cuckoos

Order: CuculiformesFamily: Cuculidae

The family Cuculidae includes cuckoos, roadrunners and anis. These birds are of variable size with slender bodies, long tails and strong legs. Many are brood parasites.

Greater coucal, Centropus sinensis
Lesser coucal, Centropus bengalensis
Sirkeer malkoha, Taccocua leschenaultii
Blue-faced malkoha, Phaenicophaeus viridirostris
Chestnut-winged cuckoo, Clamator coromandus
Jacobin cuckoo, Clamator jacobinus
Asian koel, Eudynamys scolopaceus
Banded bay cuckoo, Cacomantis sonneratii
Grey-bellied cuckoo, Cacomantis passerinus
Square-tailed drongo-cuckoo, Surniculus lugubris
Fork-tailed drongo-cuckoo, Surniculus dicruroides
Large hawk-cuckoo, Hierococcyx sparverioides
Common hawk-cuckoo, Hierococcyx varius
Lesser cuckoo, Cuculus poliocephalus
Indian cuckoo, Cuculus micropterus
Common cuckoo, Cuculus canorus

Sandgrouse
Order: PterocliformesFamily: Pteroclidae

Sandgrouse have small, pigeon like heads and necks, but sturdy compact bodies. They have long pointed wings and sometimes tails and a fast direct flight. Flocks fly to watering holes at dawn and dusk. Their legs are feathered down to the toes.

Chestnut-bellied sandgrouse, Pterocles exustus

Pigeons and doves

Order: ColumbiformesFamily: Columbidae

Pigeons and doves are stout-bodied birds with short necks and short slender bills with a fleshy cere.

Rock pigeon, Columba livia
Nilgiri wood pigeon, Columba elphinstonii
Oriental turtle dove, Streptopelia orientalis
Eurasian collared dove, Streptopelia decaocto
Red collared dove, Streptopelia tranqubarica 
Spotted dove, Spilopelia chinensis
Laughing dove, Spilopelia senegalensis
Common emerald dove, Chalcophaps indica
Orange-breasted green pigeon, Treron bicinctus
Grey-fronted green pigeon, Treron affinis
Yellow-footed green pigeon, Treron phoenicopterus
Green imperial pigeon, Ducula aenea
Mountain imperial pigeon, Ducula badia

Rails, crakes, and coots

Order: GruiformesFamily: Rallidae

Rallidae is a large family of small to medium-sized birds which includes the rails, crakes, coots and gallinules. Typically they inhabit dense vegetation in damp environments near lakes, swamps or rivers. In general they are shy and secretive birds, making them difficult to observe. Most species have strong legs and long toes which are well adapted to soft uneven surfaces. They tend to have short, rounded wings and to be weak fliers.

Slaty-breasted rail, Lewinia striata
Spotted crake, Porzana porzana  (A)
Common moorhen, Gallinula chloropus
Eurasian coot, Fulica atra
Grey-headed swamphen, Porphyrio poliocephalus
Ruddy-breasted crake, Zapornia fusca
Baillon's crake, Zapornia pusilla
Slaty-legged crake, Rallina eurizonoides
Watercock, Gallicrex cinerea
White-breasted waterhen, Amaurornis phoenicurus

Grebes
Order: PodicipediformesFamily: Podicipedidae

Grebes are small to medium-large freshwater diving birds. They have lobed toes and are excellent swimmers and divers. However, they have their feet placed far back on the body, making them quite ungainly on land.

Little grebe, Tachybaptus ruficollis

Flamingos
Order: PhoenicopteriformesFamily: Phoenicopteridae

Flamingos filter-feed on shellfish and algae. Their oddly shaped beaks are specially adapted to separate mud and silt from the food they consume and, uniquely, are used upside-down.

Greater flamingo, Phoenicopterus roseus

Buttonquail
Order: CharadriiformesFamily: Turnicidae

The buttonquail are small, drab, running birds which resemble the true quails. The female is the brighter of the sexes and initiates courtship. The male incubates the eggs and tends the young.

Yellow-legged buttonquail, Turnix tanki
Barred buttonquail, Turnix suscitator

Stone-curlews and thick-knees
Order: CharadriiformesFamily: Burhinidae

The thick-knees are a group of largely tropical waders in the family Burhinidae. They are found worldwide within the tropical zone, with some species also breeding in temperate Europe and Australia. They are medium to large waders with strong black or yellow-black bills, large yellow eyes and cryptic plumage. Despite being classed as waders, most species have a preference for arid or semi-arid habitats.

Indian stone-curlew, Burhinus indicus
Great stone-curlew, Esacus recurvirostris

Oystercatchers
Order: CharadriiformesFamily: Haematopodidae

The oystercatchers are large and noisy plover-like birds, with strong bills used for smashing or prising open molluscs.

Eurasian oystercatcher, Haematopus ostralegus

Stilts and avocets
Order: CharadriiformesFamily: Recurvirostridae

Recurvirostridae is a family of large wading birds, which includes the avocets and stilts. The avocets have long legs and long up-curved bills. The stilts have extremely long legs and long, thin, straight bills.

Black-winged stilt, Himantopus himantopus
Pied avocet, Recurvirostra avosetta

Plovers

Order: CharadriiformesFamily: Charadriidae

The family Charadriidae includes the plovers, dotterels and lapwings. They are small to medium-sized birds with compact bodies, short, thick necks and long, usually pointed, wings. They are found in open country worldwide, mostly in habitats near water.

Yellow-wattled lapwing, Vanellus malabaricus
Grey-headed lapwing, Vanellus cinereus
Red-wattled lapwing, Vanellus indicus
Sociable lapwing, Vanellus gregarius  [historical]
White-tailed lapwing, Vanellus leucurus
Pacific golden plover, Pluvialis fulva
American golden plover, Pluvialis dominica (A)
Grey plover, Pluvialis squatarola
Common ringed plover, Charadrius hiaticula 
Little ringed plover, Charadrius dubius
Kentish plover, Charadrius alexandrinus
White-faced plover, Charadrius dealbatus  (A)
Lesser sand plover, Charadrius mongolus
Greater sand plover, Charadrius leschenaultii
Caspian plover, Charadrius asiaticus

Painted-snipes
Order: CharadriiformesFamily: Rostratulidae

Painted-snipes are short-legged, long-billed birds similar in shape to the true snipes, but more brightly coloured.

Greater painted-snipe, Rostratula benghalensis

Jacanas
Order: CharadriiformesFamily: Jacanidae

The jacanas are a group of tropical waders in the family Jacanidae. They are found throughout the tropics. They are identifiable by their huge feet and claws which enable them to walk on floating vegetation in the shallow lakes that are their preferred habitat.

Pheasant-tailed jacana, Hydrophasianus chirurgus
Bronze-winged jacana, Metopidius indicus

Sandpipers and snipes

Order: CharadriiformesFamily: Scolopacidae

Scolopacidae is a large diverse family of small to medium-sized shorebirds including the sandpipers, curlews, godwits, shanks, tattlers, woodcocks, snipes, dowitchers and phalaropes. The majority of these species eat small invertebrates picked out of the mud or soil. Variation in length of legs and bills enables multiple species to feed in the same habitat, particularly on the coast, without direct competition for food.

Eurasian whimbrel, Numenius phaeopus
Eurasian curlew, Numenius arquata
Bar-tailed godwit, Limosa lapponica
Black-tailed godwit, Limosa limosa
Ruddy turnstone, Arenaria interpres
Great knot, Calidris tenuirostris
Red knot, Calidris canutus (A)
Ruff, Calidris pugnax
Broad-billed sandpiper, Calidris falcinellus
Curlew sandpiper, Calidris ferruginea
Temminck's stint, Calidris temminckii
Long-toed stint, Calidris subminuta
Sanderling, Calidris alba
Dunlin, Calidris alpina
Little stint, Calidris minuta
Buff-breasted sandpiper, Calidris subruficollis (A)
Pectoral sandpiper, Calidris melanotos  (A)
Asian dowitcher, Limnodromus semipalmatus
Long-billed dowitcher, Limnodromus scolopaceus  (A)
Eurasian woodcock, Scolopax rusticola
Jack snipe, Lymnocryptes minimus
Wood snipe, Gallinago nemoricola [historical]
Pin-tailed snipe, Gallinago stenura
Swinhoe's snipe, Gallinago megala [historical]
Common snipe, Gallinago gallinago
Terek sandpiper, Xenus cinereus
Red-necked phalarope, Phalaropus lobatus
Common sandpiper, Actitis hypoleucos
Green sandpiper, Tringa ochropus
Common redshank, Tringa totanus
Marsh sandpiper, Tringa stagnatilis
Wood sandpiper, Tringa glareola
Spotted redshank, Tringa erythropus
Common greenshank, Tringa nebularia

Crab-plover
Order: CharadriiformesFamily: Dromadidae

The crab-plover is related to the waders. It resembles a plover but with very long grey legs and a strong heavy black bill similar to a tern. It has black-and-white plumage, a long neck, partially webbed feet and a bill designed for eating crabs.

Crab-plover, Dromas ardeola

Coursers and pratincoles
Order: CharadriiformesFamily: Glareolidae

Glareolidae is a family of wading birds comprising the pratincoles, which have short legs, long pointed wings and long forked tails, and the coursers, which have long legs, short wings and long, pointed bills which curve downwards.

Indian courser, Cursorius coromandelicus  [historical]
Collared pratincole, Glareola pratincola
Oriental pratincole, Glareola maldivarum
Small pratincole, Glareola lactea

Gulls, terns, and skimmers

Order: CharadriiformesFamily: Laridae

Laridae is a family of both gulls and terns. Gulls are medium to large seabirds including kittiwakes. They are typically grey or white, often with black markings on the head or wings. They have stout, longish bills and webbed feet. Terns are a group of generally medium to large seabirds typically with grey or white plumage, often with black markings on the head. Most terns hunt fish by diving but some pick insects off the surface of fresh water. Terns are generally long-lived birds, with several species known to live in excess of 30 years.

Brown noddy, Anous stolidus
Lesser noddy, Anous tenuirostris
White tern, Gygis alba
Black-legged kittiwake, Rissa tridactyla (A)
Sabine's gull, Xema sabini (A)
Slender-billed gull, Chroicocephalus genei
Brown-headed gull, Chroicocephalus brunnicephalus
Black-headed gull, Chroicocephalus ridibundus
Pallas's gull, Ichthyaetus ichthyaetus
Common gull, Larus canus
Lesser black-backed gull, Larus fuscus
Gull-billed tern, Gelochelidon nilotica
Caspian tern, Hydroprogne caspia
Greater crested tern, Thalasseus bergii
Lesser crested tern, Thalasseus bengalensis
Sandwich tern, Thalasseus sandvicensis
Little tern, Sternula albifrons 
Bridled tern, Onychoprion anaethetus
Sooty tern, Onychoprion fuscatus
River tern, Sterna aurantia
Roseate tern, Sterna dougalli 
Common tern, Sterna hirundo
White-cheeked tern, Sterna repressa
Black-bellied tern, Sterna acuticauda
Whiskered tern, Chlidonias hybrida
White-winged tern, Chlidonias leucopterus
Black tern, Chlidonias niger (A)

Skuas
Order: CharadriiformesFamily: Stercorariidae

The family Stercorariidae are, in general, medium to large birds, typically with grey or brown plumage, often with white markings on the wings. They nest on the ground in temperate and arctic regions and are long-distance migrants.

South polar skua, Catharcta maccormicki
Brown skua, Catharcta antarctica (A)
Pomarine jaeger, Stercorarius pomarinus
Parasitic jaeger, Stercorarius parasiticus
Long-tailed jaeger, Stercorarius longicaudus (A)

Tropicbirds
Order: PhaethontiformesFamily: Phaethontidae

Tropicbirds are slender white birds of tropical oceans, with exceptionally long central tail feathers. Their heads and long wings have black markings.

Red-billed tropicbird, Phaethon aethereus
White-tailed tropicbird, Phaethon lepturus

Austral storm petrels

Order: ProcellariiformesFamily: Oceanitidae

The austral storm petrels are relatives of the petrels and are the smallest seabirds. They feed on planktonic crustaceans and small fish picked from the surface, typically while hovering. The flight is fluttering and sometimes bat-like.

Wilson's storm petrel, Oceanites oceanicus 
White-faced storm petrel, Pelagodroma marina  [historical] (A)

Northern storm petrels
Order: ProcellariiformesFamily: Hydrobatidae

The northern storm petrels are relatives of the petrels and are the smallest seabirds. They feed on planktonic crustaceans and small fish picked from the surface, typically while hovering. The flight is fluttering and sometimes bat-like.

Swinhoe's storm petrel, Hydrobates monorhis

Petrels, shearwaters, and diving petrels
Order: ProcellariiformesFamily: Procellariidae

The procellariids are the main group of medium-sized "true petrels", characterised by united nostrils with medium septum and a long outer functional primary.

Streaked shearwater, Calonectris leucomelas
Cory's shearwater, Calonectris borealis (A)
Wedge-tailed shearwater, Ardenna pacificus
Short-tailed shearwater, Ardenna tenuirostris (A)
Flesh-footed shearwater, Ardenna carneipes
Persian shearwater, Puffinus persicus
Tropical shearwater, Puffinus bailloni
Jouanin's petrel, Bulweria fallax

Storks

Order: CiconiiformesFamily: Ciconiidae

Storks are large, long-legged, long-necked, wading birds with long, stout bills. Storks are mute, but bill-clattering is an important mode of communication at the nest. Their nests can be large and may be reused for many years. Many species are migratory.

Painted stork, Mycteria leucocephala
Asian openbill, Anastomus oscitans
Black stork, Ciconia nigra
Woolly-necked stork, Ciconia episcopus
White stork, Ciconia ciconia
Lesser adjutant, Leptoptilos javanicus (A)

Frigatebirds
Order: SuliformesFamily: Fregatidae

Frigatebirds are large seabirds usually found over tropical oceans. They are large, black-and-white or completely black, with long wings and deeply forked tails. The males have coloured inflatable throat pouches. They do not swim or walk and cannot take off from a flat surface. Having the largest wingspan-to-body-weight ratio of any bird, they are essentially aerial, able to stay aloft for more than a week.

Christmas frigatebird, Fregata andrewsi (A)
Great frigatebird, Fregata minor (A)
Lesser frigatebird, Fregata ariel

Gannets and boobies
Order: SuliformesFamily: Sulidae

The sulids comprise the gannets and boobies. Both groups are medium to large coastal seabirds that plunge-dive for fish.

Masked booby, Sula dactylatra
Red-footed booby, Sula sula  (A)

Anhingas and darters

Order: SuliformesFamily: Anhingidae

Anhingas or darters are often called "snake-birds" because of their long thin neck, which gives a snake-like appearance when they swim with their bodies submerged. The males have black and dark-brown plumage, an erectile crest on the nape and a larger bill than the female. The females have much paler plumage especially on the neck and underparts. The darters have completely webbed feet and their legs are short and set far back on the body. Their plumage is somewhat permeable, like that of cormorants, and they spread their wings to dry after diving.

Oriental darter, Anhinga melanogaster

Cormorants and shags

Order: SuliformesFamily: Phalacrocoracidae

Phalacrocoracidae is a family of medium to large coastal, fish-eating seabirds that includes cormorants and shags. Plumage colouration varies, with the majority having mainly dark plumage, some species being black-and-white and a few being colourful.

Little cormorant, Microcarbo niger
Indian cormorant, Phalacrocorax fuscicollis
Great cormorant, Phalacrocorax carbo

Ibises and spoonbills

Order: PelecaniformesFamily: Threskiornithidae

Threskiornithidae is a family of large terrestrial and wading birds which includes the ibises and spoonbills. They have long, broad wings with 11 primary and about 20 secondary feathers. They are strong fliers and despite their size and weight, very capable soarers.

Black-headed ibis, Threskiornis melanocephalus
Red-naped ibis, Pseudibis papillosa
Glossy ibis, Plegadis falcinellus
Eurasian spoonbill, Platalea leucorodia

Herons and bitterns

Order: PelecaniformesFamily: Ardeidae

The family Ardeidae contains the bitterns, herons and egrets. Herons and egrets are medium to large wading birds with long necks and legs. Bitterns tend to be shorter necked and more wary. Members of Ardeidae fly with their necks retracted, unlike other long-necked birds such as storks, ibises and spoonbills.

Eurasian bittern, Botaurus stellaris
Little bittern, Ixobrychus minutus
Yellow bittern, Ixobrychus sinensis
Cinnamon bittern, Ixobrychus cinnamomeus
Black bittern, Ixobrychus flavicollis
Malayan night heron, Gorsachius melanolophus
Black-crowned night heron, Nycticorax nycticorax
Striated heron, Butorides striata
Indian pond heron, Ardeola grayii
Chinese pond heron, Ardeola bacchus  (A)
Eastern cattle egret, Bubulcus coromandus 
Grey heron, Ardea cinerea
Purple heron, Ardea purpurea
Great egret, Ardea alba
Intermediate egret, Ardea intermedia
Little egret, Egretta garzetta
Western reef heron, Egretta gularis

Pelicans

Order: PelecaniformesFamily: Pelecanidae

Pelicans are large water birds with a distinctive pouch under their beak. As with other members of the order Pelecaniformes, they have webbed feet with four toes.

Great white pelican, Pelecanus onocrotalus (A)
Spot-billed pelican, Pelecanus philippensis

Osprey
Order: AccipitriformesFamily: Pandionidae

The family Pandionidae contains usually only one species, the osprey. The osprey is a medium-large raptor which is a specialist fish-eater.
Osprey, Pandion haliaetus

Kites, hawks, and eagles

Order: AccipitriformesFamily: Accipitridae

Accipitridae is a family of birds of prey, which includes hawks, eagles, kites, harriers and Old World vultures. These birds have powerful hooked beaks for tearing flesh from their prey, strong legs, powerful talons and keen eyesight.

Black-winged kite, Elanus caeruleus
Egyptian vulture, Neophron percnopterus
Crested honey buzzard, Pernis ptilorhynchus
Jerdon's baza, Aviceda jerdoni
Black baza, Aviceda leuphotes
White-rumped vulture, Gyps bengalensis
Indian vulture, Gyps indicus
Himalayan vulture, Gyps himalayensis 
Red-headed vulture, Sarcogyps calvus
Cinereous vulture, Aegypius monachus
Crested serpent eagle, Spilornis cheela
Short-toed snake eagle, Circaetus gallicus
Changeable hawk-eagle, Nisaetus cirrhatus
Mountain hawk-eagle, Nisaetus nipalensis
Legge's hawk-eagle, Nisaetus kelaarti
Rufous-bellied eagle, Lophotriorchis kienerii
Black eagle, Ictinaetus malaiensis
Indian spotted eagle, Clanga hastata 
Greater spotted eagle, Clanga clanga
Booted eagle, Hieraaetus pennatus
Steppe eagle, Aquila nipalensis
Eastern imperial eagle, Aquila heliaca
Bonelli's eagle, Aquila fasciatus
Crested goshawk, Accipiter trivirgatus
Shikra, Accipiter badius
Besra, Accipiter virgatus
Eurasian sparrowhawk, Accipiter nisus
Western marsh harrier, Circus aeruginosus
Eastern marsh harrier, Circus spilonotus (A)
Hen harrier, Circus cyaneus 
Pallid harrier, Circus macrourus
Pied harrier, Circus melanoleucos
Montagu's harrier, Circus pygargus
Black kite, Milvus migrans
Brahminy kite, Haliastur indus
White-bellied sea eagle, Haliaeetus leucogaster
White-tailed eagle, Haliaeetus albicilla
Lesser fish eagle, Haliaeetus humilis
Grey-headed fish eagle, Haliaeetus ichthyaetus
White-eyed buzzard, Butastur teesa
Himalayan buzzard, Buteo burmanicus
Common buzzard, Buteo buteo

Barn owls
Order: StrigiformesFamily: Tytonidae

Barn owls are medium to large owls with large heads and characteristic heart-shaped faces. They have long strong legs with powerful talons.

Eastern barn owl, Tyto javanica
Eastern grass owl, Tyto longimembris 
Oriental bay owl, Phodilus badius 
Sri Lanka bay owl, Phodilus assimilis

Owls

Order: StrigiformesFamily: Strigidae

The typical owls are small to large solitary nocturnal birds of prey. They have large forward-facing eyes and ears, a hawk-like beak and a conspicuous circle of feathers around each eye called a facial disk.

Indian scops owl, Otus bakkamoena
Pallid scops owl, Otus brucei 
Oriental scops owl, Otus sunia
Indian eagle-owl, Bubo bengalensis
Spot-bellied eagle-owl, Bubo nipalensis
Brown fish owl, Ketupa zeylonensis
Mottled wood owl, Strix ocellata
Brown wood owl, Strix leptogrammica
Jungle owlet, Glaucidium radiatum
Spotted owlet, Athene brama
Brown boobook, Ninox scutulata
Short-eared owl, Asio flammeus

Trogons
Order: TrogoniformesFamily: Trogonidae

The family Trogonidae includes trogons and quetzals. Found in tropical woodlands worldwide, they feed on insects and fruit, and their broad bills and weak legs reflect their diet and arboreal habits. Although their flight is fast, they are reluctant to fly any distance. Trogons have soft, often colourful, feathers with distinctive male and female plumage.

Malabar trogon, Harpactes fasciatus

Hoopoes
Order: BucerotiformesFamily: Upupidae

Hoopoes have black, white and orangey-pink colouring with a large erectile crest on their head.

Eurasian hoopoe, Upupa epops

Hornbills

Order: BucerotiformesFamily: Bucerotidae

Hornbills are a group of birds whose bill is shaped like a cow's horn, but without a twist, sometimes with a casque on the upper mandible. Frequently, the bill is brightly coloured.

Great hornbill, Buceros bicornis
Malabar pied hornbill, Anthracoceros coronatus
Malabar grey hornbill, Ocyceros griseus
Indian grey hornbill, Ocyceros birostris

Rollers
Order: CoraciiformesFamily: Coraciidae

Rollers resemble crows in size and build, but are more closely related to the kingfishers and bee-eaters. They share the colourful appearance of those groups with blues and browns predominating. The two inner front toes are connected, but the outer toe is not.

Indian roller, Coracias benghalensis
European roller, Coracias garrulus
Oriental dollarbird, Eurystomus orientalis

Kingfishers

Order: CoraciiformesFamily: Alcedinidae

Kingfishers are medium-sized birds with large heads, long, pointed bills, short legs and stubby tails.

Stork-billed kingfisher, Pelargopsis capensis
White-throated kingfisher, Halcyon smyrnensis
Black-capped kingfisher, Halcyon pileata
Blue-eared kingfisher, Alcedo meninting
Common kingfisher, Alcedo atthis
Oriental dwarf kingfisher, Ceyx erithaca 
Pied kingfisher, Ceryle rudis

Bee-eaters

Order: CoraciiformesFamily: Meropidae

The bee-eaters are a group of near passerine birds in the family Meropidae. Most species are found in Africa but others occur in southern Europe, Madagascar, Australia and New Guinea. They are characterised by richly coloured plumage, slender bodies and usually elongated central tail feathers. All are colourful and have long downturned bills and pointed wings, which give them a swallow-like appearance when seen from afar.

Blue-bearded bee-eater, Nyctyornis athertoni
Asian green bee-eater, Merops orientalis
Blue-cheeked bee-eater, Merops persicus
Blue-tailed bee-eater, Merops philippinus
Blue-throated bee-eater, Merops viridis (A)
Chestnut-headed bee-eater, Merops leschenaulti
European bee-eater, Merops apiaster (A)

Asian barbets

Order: PiciformesFamily: Megalaimidae

The Asian barbets are plump birds, with short necks and large heads. They get their name from the bristles which fringe their heavy bills. Most species are brightly coloured.

Brown-headed barbet, Psilopogon zeylanicus
White-cheeked barbet, Psilopogon viridis
Malabar barbet, Psilopogon malabaricus 
Coppersmith barbet, Psilopogon haemacephalus

Woodpeckers

Order: PiciformesFamily: Picidae

Woodpeckers are small to medium-sized birds with chisel-like beaks, short legs, stiff tails and long tongues used for capturing insects. Some species have feet with two toes pointing forward and two backward, while several species have only three toes. Many woodpeckers have the habit of tapping noisily on tree trunks with their beaks. 
Eurasian wryneck, Jynx torquilla
Speckled piculet, Picumnus innominatus
Heart-spotted woodpecker, Hemicircus canente
Brown-capped pygmy woodpecker, Yungipicus nanus
Yellow-crowned woodpecker, Leiopicus mahrattensis
White-bellied woodpecker, Dryocopus javensis
Lesser yellownape, Picus chlorolophus
Streak-throated woodpecker, Picus xanthopygaeus
Scaly-bellied woodpecker, Picus squamatus
Common flameback, Dinopium javanense
Black-rumped flameback, Dinopium benghalense
Malabar flameback, Chrysocolaptes socialis
White-naped woodpecker, Chrysocolaptes festivus
Rufous woodpecker, Micropternus brachyurus

Caracaras and falcons
Order: FalconiformesFamily: Falconidae

Falconidae is a family of diurnal birds of prey. They differ from hawks, eagles and kites in that they kill with their beaks instead of their talons.

Lesser kestrel, Falco naumanni
Common kestrel, Falco tinnunculus
Red-necked falcon, Falco chiquera
Amur falcon, Falco amurensis
Eurasian hobby, Falco buteo (A)
Oriental hobby, Falco severus
Peregrine falcon, Falco peregrinus

Old World parrots

Order: PsittaciformesFamily: Psittaculidae

Characteristic features of parrots include a strong curved bill, an upright stance, strong legs, and clawed zygodactyl feet. Many parrots are vividly coloured, and some are multi-coloured. Old World parrots are found from Africa east across south and southeast Asia and Oceania to Australia and New Zealand.

Plum-headed parakeet, Psittacula cyanocephala
Blue-winged parakeet, Psittacula columboides
Alexandrine parakeet, Psittacula eupatria
Rose-ringed parakeet, Psittacula krameri
Vernal hanging parrot, Loriculus vernalis

Pittas
Order: PasseriformesFamily: Pittidae

Pittas are medium-sized by passerine standards and are stocky, with fairly long, strong legs, short tails and stout bills. Many are brightly coloured. They spend the majority of their time on wet forest floors, eating snails, insects and similar invertebrates.

Indian pitta, Pitta brachyura

Vangas, helmetshrikes, woodshrikes, and shrike-flycatchers
Order: PasseriformesFamily: Vangidae

The woodshrikes are similar in build to the shrikes.

Bar-winged flycatcher-shrike, Hemipus picatus
Large woodshrike, Tephrodornis virgatus (A)
Malabar woodshrike, Tephrodornis sylvicola
Common woodshrike, Tephrodornis pondicerianus

Woodswallows, butcherbirds, and peltops

Order: PasseriformesFamily: Artamidae

The woodswallows are soft-plumaged, somber-coloured passerine birds. They are smooth, agile flyers with moderately large, semi-triangular wings.

Ashy woodswallow, Artamus fuscus

Ioras
Order: PasseriformesFamily: Aegithinidae

The ioras are bulbul-like birds of open forest or thorn scrub, but whereas that group tends to be drab in colouration, ioras are sexually dimorphic, with the males being brightly plumaged in yellows and greens.

Common iora, Aegithina tiphia
Marshall's iora, Aegithina nigrolutea

Cuckooshrikes
Order: PasseriformesFamily: Campephagidae

The cuckooshrikes are small to medium-sized passerine birds. They are predominantly greyish with white and black, although some species are brightly coloured.

Small minivet, Pericrocotus cinnamomeus
Orange minivet, Pericrocotus flammeus)
Ashy minivet, Pericrocotus divaricatus
Large cuckooshrike, Coracina javensis
Black-headed cuckooshrike, Lalage melanoptera

Shrikes
Order: PasseriformesFamily: Laniidae

Shrikes are passerine birds known for their habit of catching other birds and small animals and impaling the uneaten portions of their bodies on thorns. A typical shrike's beak is hooked, like a bird of prey.

Brown shrike, Lanius cristatus (includes distinct subspecies Philippine shrike L. c. lucionensis)
Bay-backed shrike, Lanius vittatus
Long-tailed shrike, Lanius schach

Figbirds, orioles, and turnagra

Order: PasseriformesFamily: Oriolidae

The Old World orioles are colourful passerine birds. They are not related to the New World orioles.

Black-hooded oriole, Oriolus xanthornus
Indian golden oriole, Oriolus kundoo (Split from European golden oriole.)
Black-naped oriole, Oriolus chinensis

Drongos

Order: PasseriformesFamily: Dicruridae

The drongos are mostly black or dark grey in colour, sometimes with metallic tints. They have long forked tails, and some Asian species have elaborate tail decorations. They have short legs and sit very upright when perched, like a shrike. They flycatch or take prey from the ground.

Bronzed drongo, Dicrurus aeneus
Greater racket-tailed drongo, Dicrurus paradiseus
Hair-crested drongo, Dicrurus hottentottus
Ashy drongo, Dicrurus leucophaeus
White-bellied drongo, Dicrurus caerulescens
Black drongo, Dicrurus macrocercus

Fantails and silktails

Order: PasseriformesFamily: Rhipiduridae

The fantails are small insectivorous birds which are specialist aerial feeders.

White-spotted fantail, Rhipidura albogularis
White-browed fantail, Rhipidura aureola

Monarchs

Order: PasseriformesFamily: Monarchidae

The monarch flycatchers are small to medium-sized insectivorous passerines which hunt by flycatching.

Black-naped monarch, Hypothymis azurea
Indian paradise flycatcher, Terpsiphone paradisi

Crows and jays

Order: PasseriformesFamily: Corvidae

The family Corvidae includes crows, ravens, jays, choughs, magpies, treepies, nutcrackers and ground jays. Corvids are above average in size among the Passeriformes, and some of the larger species show high levels of intelligence.

Rufous treepie, Dendrocitta vagabunda
White-bellied treepie, Dendrocitta leucogastra
House crow, Corvus splendens
Large-billed crow, Corvus macrorhynchos
Eastern jungle crow, Corvus levaillantii
Indian jungle crow, Corvus culminatus

Fairy flycatchers
Order: PasseriformesFamily: Stenostiridae

Most of the species of this small family are found in Africa, though a few inhabit tropical Asia. They are not closely related to other birds called "flycatchers".

Grey-headed canary-flycatcher, Culicicapa ceylonensis

Tits and chickadees
Order: PasseriformesFamily: Paridae

The Paridae are mainly small stocky woodland species with short stout bills. Some have crests. They are adaptable birds, with a mixed diet including seeds and insects.

Cinereous tit, Parus cinereus (known earlier as great tit, Parus major)
Himalayan black-lored tit, Machlolophus xanthogenys
Indian black-lored tit, Machlolophus aplonotus

Larks

Order: PasseriformesFamily: Alaudidae

Larks are small terrestrial birds with often extravagant songs and display flights. Most larks are fairly dull in appearance. Their food is insects and seeds.

Rufous-tailed lark, Ammomanes phoenicura
Ashy-crowned sparrow-lark, Eremopterix griseus
Jerdon's bushlark, Mirafra affinis
Oriental skylark, Alauda gulgula
Malabar lark, Galerida malabarica
Mongolian short-toed lark, Calandrella dukhunensis

Bulbuls

Order: PasseriformesFamily: Pycnonotidae

Bulbuls are medium-sized songbirds. Some are colourful with yellow, red or orange vents, cheeks, throats or supercilia, but most are drab, with uniform olive-brown to black plumage.

Yellow-browed bulbul, Acritillas indica
Black bulbul, Hypsipetes leucocephalus 
Square-tailed bulbul, Hypsipetes ganeesa 
Grey-headed bulbul, Brachypodius priocephalus
Black-crested bulbul, Rubigula flaviventris 
Flame-throated bulbul, Rubigula gularis
White-browed bulbul, Pycnonotus luteolus
Yellow-throated bulbul, Pycnonotus xantholaemus
Red-whiskered bulbul, Pycnonotus jocosus
Red-vented bulbul, Pycnonotus cafer

Swallows and martins
Order: PasseriformesFamily: Hirundinidae

The family Hirundinidae is adapted to aerial feeding. They have a slender streamlined body, long pointed wings and a short bill with a wide gape. The feet are adapted to perching rather than walking, and the front toes are partially joined at the base.

Grey-throated martin, Riparia chinensis
Pale martin, Riparia diluta
Barn swallow, Hirundo rustica
Pacific swallow, Hirundo tahitica
Hill swallow, Hirundo domicola
Wire-tailed swallow, Hirundo smithii
Eurasian crag martin, Ptyonoprogne rupestris
Dusky crag martin, Ptyonoprogne concolor
Common house martin, Delichon urbicum
Red-rumped swallow, Cecropis daurica
Streak-throated swallow, Petrochelidon fluvicola

Leaf warblers & allies
Order: PasseriformesFamily: Phylloscopidae

Leaf warblers are a family of small insectivorous birds found mostly in Eurasia and ranging into Wallacea and Africa. The species are of various sizes, often green-plumaged above and yellow below, or more subdued with grayish-green to grayish-brown colors.

Hume's leaf warbler, Phylloscopus humei 
Yellow-browed warbler, Phylloscopus inornatus
Tytler's leaf warbler, Phylloscopus tytleri
Tickell's leaf warbler, Phylloscopus affinis
Common chiffchaff, Phylloscopus collybita
Green warbler, Phylloscopus nitidus
Greenish warbler, Phylloscopus trochiloides 
Large-billed leaf warbler, Phylloscopus magnirostris
Western crowned warbler, Phylloscopus occipitalis

Reed warblers, Grauer’s warbler, & allies
Order: PasseriformesFamily: Acrocephalidae

The members of this family are usually rather large for "warblers". Most are rather plain olivaceous brown above with much yellow to beige below. They are usually found in open woodland, reedbeds, or tall grass. The family occurs mostly in southern to western Eurasia and surroundings, but it also ranges far into the Pacific, with some species in Africa.

Clamorous reed warbler, Acrocephalus stentoreus
Paddyfield warbler, Acrocephalus agricola
Blyth's reed warbler, Acrocephalus dumetorum
Thick-billed warbler, Arundinax aedon
Booted warbler, Iduna caligata
Sykes's warbler, Iduna rama

Grassbirds & allies
Order: PasseriformesFamily: Locustellidae

Locustellidae are a family of small insectivorous songbirds found mainly in Eurasia, Africa, and the Australian region. They are smallish birds with tails that are usually long and pointed, and tend to be drab brownish or buffy all over.

Pallas's grasshopper warbler, Helopsaltes certhiola  [historical]
Common grasshopper warbler, Locustella naevia
Broad-tailed grassbird, Schoenicola platyurus
Bristled grassbird, Schoenicola striatus

Cisticolas and allies

Order: PasseriformesFamily: Cisticolidae

The Cisticolidae are warblers found mainly in warmer southern regions of the Old World. They are generally very small birds of drab brown or grey appearance found in open country such as grassland or scrub.

Zitting cisticola, Cisticola juncidis
Golden-headed cisticola, Cisticola exilis
Grey-breasted prinia, Prinia hodgsonii
Jungle prinia, Prinia sylvatica
Ashy prinia, Prinia socialis
Plain prinia, Prinia inornata
Common tailorbird, Orthotomus sutorius

Sylviid babblers
Order: PasseriformesFamily: Sylviidae

The family Sylviidae is a group of small insectivorous passerine birds. They mainly occur as breeding species, as the common name implies, in Europe, Asia and, to a lesser extent, Africa. Most are of generally undistinguished appearance, but many have distinctive songs.

Lesser whitethroat, Curruca curruca
Hume's whitethroat, Curruca althaea
Eastern Orphean warbler, Curruca crassirostris

Parrotbills and allies

Order: PasseriformesFamily: Paradoxornithidae

The parrotbills are a group of peculiar birds native to East and Southeast Asia, though feral populations exist elsewhere. They are generally small, long-tailed birds which inhabit reedbeds and similar habitat. They feed mainly on seeds, e.g. of grasses, to which their bill, as the name implies, is well-adapted.

Yellow-eyed babbler, Chrysomma sinense

White-eyes
Order: PasseriformesFamily: Zosteropidae

The white-eyes are small and mostly undistinguished, their plumage above being generally some dull colour like greenish-olive, but some species have a white or bright yellow throat, breast or lower parts, and several have buff flanks. As their name suggests, many species have a white ring around each eye.

Indian white-eye, Zosterops palpebrosus

Babblers and scimitar babblers
Order: PasseriformesFamily: Timaliidae

The babblers, or timaliids, are somewhat diverse in size and colouration, but are characterised by soft fluffy plumage.

Tawny-bellied babbler, Dumetia hyperythra
Dark-fronted babbler, Dumetia atriceps
White-browed scimitar babbler, Pomatorhinus schisticeps
Indian scimitar babbler, Pomatorhinus horsfieldii

Ground babblers
Order: PasseriformesFamily: Pellorneidae

These small to medium-sized songbirds have soft fluffy plumage but are otherwise rather diverse. Members of the genus Illadopsis are found in forests, but some other genera are birds of scrublands.

Puff-throated babbler, Pellorneum ruficeps

Alcippe fulvettas
Order: PasseriformesFamily: Alcippeidae

The genus once included many other fulvettas and was previously placed in families Pellorneidae or Timaliidae.

Brown-cheeked fulvetta, Alcippe poioicephala

Laughingthrushes and allies

Order: PasseriformesFamily: Leiothrichidae

The members of this family are diverse in size and colouration, though those of genus Turdoides tend to be brown or greyish. The family is found in Africa, India, and southeast Asia.
 
Banasura laughingthrush, Montecincla jerdoni
Nilgiri laughingthrush, Montecincla cachinnans
Palani laughingthrush, Montecincla fairbanki 
Ashambu laughingthrush, Montecincla meridionalis 
Large grey babbler, Argya malcolmi
Rufous babbler, Argya subrufa
Jungle babbler, Argya striata
Yellow-billed babbler, Argya affinis
Wayanad laughingthrush, Pterorhinus delesserti

Fairy-bluebirds
Order: PasseriformesFamily: Irenidae

The fairy-bluebirds are bulbul-like birds of open forest or thorn scrub. The males are dark-blue and the females a duller green. 

Asian fairy-bluebird, Irena puella

Nuthatches
Order: PasseriformesFamily: Sittidae

Nuthatches are small woodland birds. They have the unusual ability to climb down trees head first, unlike other birds which can only go upwards. Nuthatches have big heads, short tails and powerful bills and feet.

Velvet-fronted nuthatch, Sitta frontalis
Indian nuthatch, Sitta castanea

Starlings and rhabdornis

Order: PasseriformesFamily: Sturnidae

Starlings are small to medium-sized passerine birds. Their flight is strong and direct and they are very gregarious. Their preferred habitat is fairly open country. They eat insects and fruit. Plumage is typically dark with a metallic sheen.

Common hill myna, Gracula religiosa
Southern hill myna, Gracula indica
Jungle myna, Acridotheres fuscus
Common myna, Acridotheres tristis
Daurian starling, Agropsar sturninus (A)
Chestnut-tailed starling, Sturnia malabarica
Malabar starling, Sturnia blythii
Brahminy starling, Sturnia pagodarum
Rosy starling, Pastor roseus
Common starling, Sturnus vulgaris

Thrushes

Order: PasseriformesFamily: Turdidae

The thrushes are a group of passerine birds that occur mainly in the Old World. They are plump, soft plumaged, small to medium-sized insectivores or sometimes omnivores, often feeding on the ground. Many have attractive songs.

Pied thrush, Geokichla wardii
Orange-headed thrush, Geokichla citrina 
Scaly thrush, Zoothera dauma 
Nilgiri thrush, Zoothera neilgherriensis 
Indian blackbird, Turdus simillimus 
Eyebrowed thrush, Turdus obscurus

Chats and Old World flycatchers

Order: PasseriformesFamily: Muscicapidae

Chats and Old World flycatchers is a large group of small passerine birds native to the Old World. They are mainly small arboreal insectivores. The appearance of these birds is highly varied, but they mostly have weak songs and harsh calls.

Indian robin, Copsychus fulicatus
Oriental magpie-robin, Copsychus saularis
White-rumped shama, Copsychus malabaricus
Asian brown flycatcher, Muscicapa dauurica
Brown-breasted flycatcher, Muscicapa muttui
White-bellied blue flycatcher, Cyornis pallipes
Tickell's blue flycatcher, Cyornis tickelliae
Blue-throated blue flycatcher, Cyornis rubeculoides
Blue-and-white flycatcher, Cyanoptila cyanomelana (A)
Verditer flycatcher, Eumyias thalassinus
Nilgiri flycatcher, Eumyias albicaudatus
Indian blue robin, Larvivora brunnea
Bluethroat, Luscinia svecica
Nilgiri blue robin, Sholicola major
White-bellied blue robin, Sholicola albiventris
Malabar whistling thrush, Myophonus horsfieldii
Yellow-rumped flycatcher, Ficedula zanthopygia
Ultramarine flycatcher, Ficedula superciliaris  (A)
Rusty-tailed flycatcher, Ficedula ruficauda
Taiga flycatcher, Ficedula albicilla
Red-breasted flycatcher, Ficedula parva (A)
Kashmir flycatcher, Ficedula subrubra
Black-and-orange flycatcher, Ficedula nigrorufa
Black redstart, Phoenicurus ochruros
Common rock thrush, Monticola saxatilis (A)
Blue rock thrush, Monticola solitarius
Blue-capped rock thrush, Monticola cinclorhyncha
Siberian stonechat, Saxicola maurus
Pied bush chat, Saxicola caprata
Northern wheatear, Oenanthe oenanthe (A)
Isabelline wheatear, Oenanthe isabellina
Desert wheatear, Oenanthe deserti
Pied wheatear, Oenanthe pleschanka  (A)

Variable wheatear, Oenanthe picata

Leafbirds
Order: PasseriformesFamily: Chloropseidae

The leafbirds are small, bulbul-like birds. The males are brightly plumaged, usually in greens and yellows.

Jerdon's leafbird, Chloropsis jerdoni
Golden-fronted leafbird, Chloropsis aurifrons

Flowerpeckers

Order: PasseriformesFamily: Dicaeidae

The flowerpeckers are very small, stout, often brightly coloured birds, with short tails, short thick curved bills and tubular tongues.

Thick-billed flowerpecker, Dicaeum agile
Pale-billed flowerpecker, Dicaeum erythrorhynchos
Nilgiri flowerpecker, Dicaeum concolor
Plain flowerpecker, Dicaeum minullum

Sunbirds

Order: PasseriformesFamily: Nectariniidae

The sunbirds and spiderhunters are very small passerine birds which feed largely on nectar, although they will also take insects, especially when feeding young. Flight is fast and direct on their short wings. Most species can take nectar by hovering like a hummingbird, but usually perch to feed.

Purple-rumped sunbird, Leptocoma zeylonica
Crimson-backed sunbird, Leptocoma minima 
Purple sunbird, Cinnyris asiaticus
Loten's sunbird, Cinnyris lotenius
Little spiderhunter, Arachnothera longirostra

Old World sparrows and snowfinches
Order: PasseriformesFamily: Passeridae

Sparrows are small passerine birds. In general, sparrows tend to be small, plump, brown or grey birds with short tails and short powerful beaks. Sparrows are seed eaters, but they also consume small insects.

House sparrow, Passer domesticus
Pale rockfinch, Carpospiza brachydactyla (A)
Yellow-throated sparrow, Gymnoris xanthocollis

Weavers and widowbirds
Order: PasseriformesFamily: Ploceidae

The weavers are small passerine birds related to the finches. They are seed-eating birds with rounded conical bills. The males of many species are brightly coloured, usually in red or yellow and black, some species show variation in colour only in the breeding season.

Streaked weaver, Ploceus manyar
Baya weaver, Ploceus philippinus

Waxbills, munias, and allies
Order: PasseriformesFamily: Estrildidae

The estrildid finches are small passerine birds of the Old World tropics and Australasia. They are gregarious and often colonial seed eaters with short thick but pointed bills. They are all similar in structure and habits, but have wide variation in plumage colours and patterns.

Indian silverbill, Euodice malabarica
Scaly-breasted munia, Lonchura punctulata
Black-throated munia, Lonchura kelaarti
White-rumped munia, Lonchura striata
Tricolored munia, Lonchura malacca 
Red avadavat, Amandava amandava

Wagtails and pipits

Order: PasseriformesFamily: Motacillidae

Motacillidae is a family of small passerine birds with medium to long tails. They include the wagtails, longclaws and pipits. They are slender, ground feeding insectivores of open country.

Forest wagtail, Dendronanthus indicus
Western yellow wagtail, Motacilla flava
Citrine wagtail, Motacilla citreola
Grey wagtail, Motacilla cinerea
White wagtail, Motacilla alba
White-browed wagtail, Motacilla maderaspatensis
Richard's pipit, Anthus richardi
Paddyfield pipit, Anthus rufulus
Blyth's pipit, Anthus godlewskii
Tawny pipit, Anthus campestris
Long-billed pipit, Anthus similis 
Tree pipit, Anthus trivialis
Olive-backed pipit, Anthus hodgsoni
Red-throated pipit, Anthus cervinus
Nilgiri pipit, Anthus nilghiriensis

Finches and euphonias
Order: PasseriformesFamily: Fringillidae

Finches are seed-eating passerine birds, that are small to moderately large and have a strong beak, usually conical and in some species very large. All have twelve tail feathers and nine primaries. These birds have a bouncing flight with alternating bouts of flapping and gliding on closed wings, and most sing well.

Common rosefinch, Carpodacus erythrina

Buntings
Order: PasseriformesFamily: Emberizidae

The emberizids are a large family of passerine birds. They are seed-eating birds with distinctively shaped bills. In Europe, most species are called buntings. In North America, most of the species in this family are known as sparrows, but these birds are not closely related to the Old World sparrows which are in the family Passeridae. Many emberizid species have distinctive head patterns.

Crested bunting, Emberiza lathami
Grey-necked bunting, Emberiza buchanani 
Little bunting, Emberiza pusilla  (A)
Yellow-breasted bunting, Emberiza aureola
Black-headed bunting, Emberiza melanocephala
Red-headed bunting, Emberiza bruniceps

See also
 Lists of birds by region

References

 
 

 Gjershaug, J. O.; Diserud, O. H.; Rasmussen, P. C. & Warakagoda, D. (2008) "An overlooked threatened species of eagle: Legge's Hawk Eagle Nisaetus kelaarti (Aves: Accipitriformes)" (PDF) Zootaxa 1792: 54–66

Birds
Birds of Kerala
Kerala